Kıbrıs Postası (Turkish for The Cyprus Post) is a daily newspaper in Northern Cyprus owned by Citypress Yayıncılık Ltd. It has been published since 22 November 2001 and has the largest online readership of any Turkish Cypriot newspaper.

See also
List of newspapers in Cyprus
List of newspapers in Northern Cyprus

Publications established in 2001
Newspapers published in Cyprus
Newspapers published in Northern Cyprus